Recycling in Northern Ireland

By 2020, roughly 51% of waste was being recycled, composted, or reused in Northern Ireland. Northern Ireland's local councils have statutory responsibility for the collection and disposal of waste, and as such are the lead actors in promoting recycling.  The Northern Ireland Department of the Environment published its first Waste Management Strategy in 2000. Subsequently, local councils came together to form three separate subregional waste management partnerships: arc21 (consisting of councils in the east of Northern Ireland), the North West Region Waste Management Group, and SWaMP (the Southern Waste Management Partnership). In 2015, SWaMP disbanded.

In the original 2000 Waste Management Strategy, local councils were set the target of recycling and composting 15% of household waste by 2005 and 25% by 2010.  In the second Waste Management Strategy, launched in early 2006, new, bolder targets were set for recycling (including composting) 35% of waste by 2010, 40% by 2015, and 45% by 2020. In June 2012, Northern Ireland's then environment minister Alex Attwood announced plans to make it compulsory for local councils to achieve a 60% waste recycling rate by 2020. According to data contained in the Northern Ireland Municipal Waste Management Statistics Annual Report 2010-11 (covering April 2010 to March 2011), the 2010 target was met, with the overall recycling rate reaching 35.5%.

Over the past decade recycling and composting rates have increased considerably in Northern Ireland from roughly 5% in 1999 to 51% in 2019–2020.

In addition to more waste being recycled and composted, the amount of waste being produced in the first place has gone down in recent years, decreasing from an all-time recorded high of 1,064,090 tonnes in 2006–2007 to a low of 913,546 tonnes in 2012–2013, rising to 998,985 tonnes in 2019–2020.

Recycling Rates

Below are tables that summarise gains made in recent years in diverting waste from landfill through recycling, composting, and reuse. The figures in these tables refer to the proportion of total local authority collected municipal waste being sent for recycling and composting (and reuse). The data come from Northern Ireland's Department of the Environment municipal waste reports.  Since the mid-2000s, local councils in Northern Ireland have been required to report data on municipal waste arisings on a quarterly basis.

The table below contains information for the 26 councils that existed prior to the reorganisation of local government in 2015.

See also
Recycling
Recycling in the United Kingdom
Recycling in Ireland

References

Recycling in the United Kingdom